This is a list of baseball players from Colombia who have played in Major League Baseball. Lou Castro was the first player from Colombia to make it into the Major Leagues, but it would be over seventy years before another made it. In Bold denotes still active players in the league.

Players

References

External links
Players Born in Colombia - Baseball-Reference.com

Baseball
Colombia